Gunjwane Dam, is an earthfill and gravity dam on Kanand river near Velhe, Pune district in state of Maharashtra in India.

Specifications

The purpose of Gunjwane project is irrigation. Here new type of irrigation system is used called micro irrigation system. Here water distribution is done by P D N .

See also
 Dams in Maharashtra
 List of reservoirs and dams in India

References

Dams in Pune district
Dams completed in 2000
2000 establishments in Maharashtra